The initials BMFMS may refer to:
Sibiu Stock Exchange, known as Bursa Monetar Financiarã şi de Mãrfuri Sibiu in Romanian.
British Maternal and Fetal Medicine Society